The Trivandrum Central–Mangaluru Central Express is an Express train belonging to Southern Railway zone that runs between  and Mangaluru Central in India. It is currently being operated with 16347/16348 train numbers on a daily basis. It first began operations as Ernakulam/CHTS Kannur express and then was extended to Trivandrum on the Southside and ran as Trivandrum Kannur Express,This train was then again extended to Mangaluru Central to provide connectivity to the people of Kasaragod with the state capital.In the Southern Railway Timetable Conference 2020,It has been decided to extend this train to Nagercoil as People of Nagercoil,Kanyakumari want an Overnight train to Mangaluru and north Kerala.

Service

The 16347/Thiruvananthapuram–Mangaluru Express has an average speed of 44 km/h and covers 632 km in 14h 15m. The 16348/Mangaluru–Thiruvananthapuram Express has an average speed of 44 km/h and covers 632 km in 14h 15m.

Schedule

Route and halts 

The important halts of the train are:

Coach composition

The train has standard ICF rakes with a max speed of 110 km/h. The train consists of 24 coaches:

 1 AC II Tier
 4 AC III Tier
 12 Sleeper coaches
 5 General Unreserved
 2 Seating cum Luggage Rake

Traction

The route is fully electrified, and both trains are hauled by an Erode/Royapuram-based WAP-4/WAP-7 loco.

Rake sharing

The train shares its rake with 12619/12620 Matsyagandha Express.

See also 

 Thiruvananthapuram Central railway station
 Mangalore Central railway station
 Thiruvananthapuram–Mangalore high-speed passenger corridor

Notes

References

External links 

 16347/Thiruvananthapuram–Mangaluru Express India Rail Info
 16348/Mangaluru–Thiruvananthapuram Express India Rail Info

Transport in Thiruvananthapuram
Transport in Mangalore
Express trains in India
Rail transport in Tamil Nadu
Rail transport in Puducherry
Rail transport in Karnataka